Kingsway/Royal Alex station is an Edmonton Light Rail Transit station in Edmonton, Alberta. It serves the Metro Line. It is located adjacent to the Royal Alexandra Hospital on the north side of Kingsway. The Kingsway/Royal Alex Transit Centre, constructed at the same time, is located next to the station.

History
Preliminary engineering of the line was completed in July 2009 and construction of the phase from MacEwan station to NAIT station began in the summer of 2011. The line is estimated to cost around $665 million and opened on September 6, 2015.

Around the station
Kingsway Mall
Royal Alexandra Hospital
Central McDougall
Centre for Education
Glenrose Rehabilitation Hospital
Spruce Avenue
Victoria School of the Arts

Kingsway/Royal Alex Transit Centre

The Kingsway/Royal Alex Transit Centre is located on the south side of 111 Avenue, east of 106 Street. The transit centre is served by ETS and St. Albert Transit (StAT). It has several amenities including bike racks, public washrooms, a large shelter and a pay phone. There is no park and ride, drop off area and no vending machines at this transit centre.

The transit centre opened on June 29, 2014 and replaced the existing transit centre that was located next to Kingsway Mall.

The following bus routes serve the transit centre:

The above list does not include LRT services from the adjacent LRT station.

References

Edmonton Light Rail Transit stations
Edmonton Transit Service transit centres
Railway stations in Canada opened in 2015
Metro Line